Carefree Travellers is a South Korean television program that aired on JTBC.

Season 1 starred Kim Yong-man, Kim Sung-joo, Ahn Jung-hwan and Jeong Hyeong-don. Season 2 starred Park Joon-hyung (g.o.d), Eun Ji-won (Sechs Kies), Noh Hong-chul, Hwang Je-sung and Sung Hoon.

Season 3, also known as Carefree Travellers Returns (뭉뜬 리턴즈) will premier on March 7, 2023, with the same cast as Season 1.

Airtime

Season 1

Season 2

Season 3 (Carefree Travellers Returns)

Cast

Season 1, 3
 Kim Yong-man
 Kim Sung-joo
 Ahn Jung-hwan
 Jung Hyung-don

Season 2
 Park Joon-hyung (g.o.d) (Episode 1-11)
 Sung Hoon (Episode 1-11)
 Eun Ji-won (Sechs Kies) (Episode 5-11)
 Noh Hong-chul (Episode 5-15)
 Hwang Je-sung (Episode 5-10)
 Yoo Seon-ho (Episode 1-4)
 Cha Eun-woo (Episode 4-8)

Program
It is a travel program whereby the cast travel around various countries in the form of package tours alongside participating travellers and invited guests, but without the usual managers, talent agents and various staff behind the scenes tagging along.

For Season 2, slightly different from Season 1, the cast, invited guests and participating travellers travel around various countries experiencing local cultures, based on the schedule tailored from the wish lists of the fixed cast and invited guests, and following local package tours.

For Season 3, instead of following package tours, the cast members go on backpacking trips on their own, with every aspect of the trip to be planned on their own, from accommodation to food to places of interest.

Episodes

Season 1

2016

2017

2018

Season 2

2018

2019

Season 3

2023

Ratings
In the ratings below, the highest rating for the show will be in red, and the lowest rating for the show will be in blue each year.

Season 1

2016

2017

2018

Season 2

2018

2019

Season 3

2023

NR rating means "not reported".
 TNmS have stopped publishing their rating report from June 2018.

References

External links
 
 

South Korean travel television series